The 2007 East–West Shrine Game was the 82nd staging of the all-star college football exhibition game featuring NCAA Division I Football Bowl Subdivision players. The game featured over 90 players from the 2006 college football season, and prospects for the 2007 Draft of the professional National Football League (NFL). In the week prior to the game, scouts from all 32 NFL teams attended. The proceeds from the East–West Shrine Game benefit Shriners Hospitals for Children.

The game was played on January 20, 2007, at 6 p.m. CT at Reliant Stadium in Houston, and was televised by ESPN2.

The offensive MVP was Jeff Rowe (QB, Nevada), while the defensive MVP was Dan Bazuin (DE, Central Michigan). The Pat Tillman Award was presented to Kyle Shotwell (LB, Cal Poly); the award "is presented to a player who best exemplifies character, intelligence, sportsmanship and service".

Scoring summary 

Sources:

Statistics 

Source:

Coaching staff 
East head coach: Don Shula

West head coach: Dan Reeves

Source:

Rosters 
Source:

2007 NFL Draft

References

Further reading 
 
 

East-West Shrine Game
East–West Shrine Bowl
American football competitions in Houston
January 2007 sports events in the United States
East-West Shrine Game
2007 in Houston